Ronald W. Reagan/Doral Senior High School is a secondary school located at 8600 NW 107 Avenue, in Doral, Florida, United States, a Miami suburb; its principal is Ramón Garrigo. The school offers, alongside Advanced Placement courses, International General Certificate of Secondary Education (IGCSE) courses, Advanced Subsidiary (AS) courses, and A-level courses, which are international examinations valid across the world.

Within its attendance boundary are portions of Doral and the residential areas in Medley.

History 
The school's construction broke ground on February 1, 2005. It was built as a relief school for overcrowded Miami Springs Senior High School, which used to the serve the area. It was named after Ronald Reagan, a former President of the United States. It opened with 815 students. The first principal, Douglas Rodriguez, was the former principal at Miami Springs.

Outdoor facilities include football, softball, baseball and soccer fields, as well as basketball, racquetball, and tennis courts. The facilities also include an 800-seat auditorium, a 700-seat cafeteria, a state-of-the-art Media Center, and an indoor gymnasium. The school opened its doors to students on August 14, 2006. In the 2008–2009 school year, 12th-grade students located within the boundaries of the school who used to be zoned to Miami Springs Senior High School were zoned to Reagan/Doral, making this the first year that the school had all four grade levels (9-12). Reagan/Doral's first graduating class was the class of 2009.

Reagan/Doral's athletic rivals are Miami Springs High School and Doral Academy Charter High School. A more informal rival is Mater Academy Charter School. At the 2007 homecoming pep rally, the classes of 2009, 2010, and 2011 named the mascot "Tyson D. Bison." (formerly known as Tyson Bison)

The school yearbook is Tatanka ("American Bison" in the Lakota language) and the monthly free newspaper is the Reagan Advocate.

In 2011-2020 due to overcrowding of students Reagan moved 9th graders to South Campus at the former Doral Middle School Building until the new JC Bermudez High School Opened in the fall of 2020.

In February 2008, the City of Doral Trolley began service to Reagan/Doral.

Former Principal Douglas Rodriguez was named Miami-Dade County Principal of the Year for 2008 in an awards ceremony on May 6, 2008. He was also the proud recipient of the 6th Annual Leonard Miller Principal Leadership Award and the Florida Principal of the Year Award.

On December 12, 2008, Rodriguez's tenure as principal of the school ended and he became principal of Miami Central High School. 

The current principal is Juan Carlos Boué.

Campus
The school has a mural honoring two students and former students who died in automobile accidents: 21-year old Andrea Castillo, a member of the Class of 2009 who died in 2012; and 17-year old Raphael Acevedo, a fourth-year student (senior) who died in 2014. Area artist Tony Mendoza designed the murals.

Academic achievements
The State's Accountability program grades a school by a complex formula that looks at both current scores and annual improvement on the Reading, Math, Writing and Science FCATs.
2006-2007: A
2007-2008: A
2017-2018: C
2018-2019: A
 Reagan/Doral was the only non-magnet high school within the Miami-Dade County Public School system to receive an A grade for its opening school year (2006–2007). School ranking is based on student FCAT performance.
It is also the only school in Miami-Dade County Public Schools' history, thus far, to have received an A grade for its opening year.

School clubs
Since the first graduation in 2009, Ronald Reagan Doral Senior High TV production (RTV) has recorded all school graduations done out of Florida International University, including those of other schools. RTV began recording other schools' graduations after it discovered that nobody else was filming them.

See also

 Miami-Dade County Public Schools
 Education in the United States

References

External links
 Ronald W. Reagan/Doral High School
 Ronald W. Reagan/Doral Sr. High Miami-Dade County Public Schools (Archive). Advance-ed.

Reagan
Miami-Dade County Public Schools high schools
Reagan
Doral, Florida
2006 establishments in Florida